The 1913–14 Sheffield Shield season was the 22nd season of the Sheffield Shield, the domestic first-class cricket competition of Australia. New South Wales won the championship.

Table

Statistics

Most Runs
Charlie Macartney 445

Most Wickets
Jack Crawford 33

References

Sheffield Shield
Sheffield Shield
Sheffield Shield seasons